Nathan Benjamin Young (September 15, 1862—July 19, 1933) was an American educator who helped advance black education in the early 20th century. Born a slave in Alabama, Young later became an educator after Booker T. Washington, who witnessed Young’s skills in debating, invited him to teach at the Tuskegee Institute. Following his career as a teacher, Young later became a president of two major universities, Florida A&M University and Lincoln University. He and Henry Lee De Forest, the president of Talladega College, started a campaign to help improve education for the African American community.

Early life 
Nathan B. Young was born a slave in Chatham, Virginia. His mother is Susan Smith, also born a slave in the South. Before the Civil War started she gave birth to Nathan. Then they were sold off to a plantation overseer who tried to dodge the draft. Smith started to figure out that there was an underlying reason to dodge the draft, which was to keep them enslaved. His mother created a plot to escape slavery and run away to Tuscaloosa. Young and those who knew Young acknowledged the strength of his mother’s actions. Even Young’s stepfather was a strong individual. He took up firearms to ward of the local Ku Klux Klan. Many people like, Antonio F Holland believe that his mother and stepfather, Frank Young helped shape him into the strong figure that he was.

Education 
After enrolling in a small school which was operated by a white baptist minister in Tuscaloosa, Young attended Stillman College for three months. Following his work at this college, Young attended Talladega College where he received a classical education in the teacher-training branch. At Talladega, he met Henry Lee De Forest who later became one of his closest allies. Once he decided that his passion was to teach, he enrolled in  Oberlin College where he obtained a bachelor’s and master's degree.

Career 

After his formal education, Young vigorously pursued a career in teaching. He first began teaching in the 1880s during his time at Talladega, where he taught  in rural areas of Alabama during the summer. From 1892 to 1897, he was invited to serve as the head of Tuskegee Institute’s academic department at by Booker T. Washington. Soon after, he was employed at Georgia State Industrial College as the Director of Teacher Training. Young also served as the President of Florida A&M University in 1901. Afterwards, he became the President of Lincoln University.

Speeches 
 An Upward Departure in Negro Education at the National Association of Teachers in Colored Schools

References

External links 

1862 births
1933 deaths
Oberlin College alumni
Tuskegee University faculty
Presidents of Florida A&M University
Presidents of Lincoln University (Missouri)